The mixed doubles tournament at the 1983 French Open was held from 23 May until 5 June 1983 on the outdoor clay courts at the Stade Roland Garros in Paris, France. Barbara Jordan and Eliot Teltscher won the title, defeating Leslie Allen and Charles Strode in the final.

Draw

Finals

Top half

Section 1

Section 2

Bottom half

Section 3

Section 4

External links
1983 French Open – Doubles draws and results at the International Tennis Federation

Mixed Doubles
French Open by year – Mixed doubles